From 172 to 174, the religious leader Xu Chang led a major uprising against the Han dynasty of China in the Kuaiji Commandery. Having proclaimed himself emperor while restoring the ancient state of Yue, Xu and his followers initially proved successful and overran much of Kuaiji. The Han central government consequently appointed Zhang Min as commander of the local pro-government forces and mobilized soldiers from across Yang Province. In late 174, the insurgents were finally destroyed.

Primary sources 
Xu Chang's rebellion is mentioned in several primary sources, namely the "Annals of the Later Han", the "Records of the Three Kingdoms", the Zizhi Tongjian, and the Dongguan Hanji. These sources do not give detailed descriptions of the rebellion, and differ on several aspects, including the names and titles of the uprising's leaders. Some differences can be reconciled, while the most likely name of the head of the insurgency is "Xu Chang", as the name is associated with a prophecy about dynastic change in the Zuo zhuan. By the late 2nd century, many believed that the prophecy claimed that someone named or connected with "xuchang" would overthrow the Han dynasty. Sinologist Rafe de Crespigny argued that the rebel leader probably based his uprising on his name, perhaps even adopting the name "Xu Chang" to fit the prophecy.

Background 

The Han dynasty of China faced growing difficulties in the 160s and 170s, as its central government became ever more factionalised and corrupt, while its regional authority suffered from defeats along the northern frontier as well as tensions with the local gentry across the empire. Despite these difficulties, the Han empire remained relatively stable, although religious movements spread as many people sought salvation from plagues and famines. The lower Yangtze region was one of the centers for unorthodox cults opposed to the state ideology of Confucianism. Many heterodox cults promised to provide healing as well as secret knowledge. One of the local sects was led by a man named Xu Chang who claimed to have supernatural powers. His followers probably included both Han Chinese as well as Yue tribespeople.

Rebellion 

Xu Chang launched his uprising at Juzhang (Ningbo) in 172, declaring himself "Emperor of the Brightness of Yang", while appointing his father Xu Sheng "King of Yue", formally reviving the ancient state of the same name that had been destroyed in the 4th or 3rd century BC. According to some of the primary sources, Xu Chang had a brother or son named Xu Zhao and/or Xu Shao who also received titles. However, it is possible that Xu Zhao / Xu Shao were actually alternate names for Xu Cheng. Besides the Xu family, a local tribal chieftain named Ju Kang served as rebel leader. The rebellion is believed to have been religiously motivated, although sinologist Werner Eichhorn has speculated that the uprising might also have been a nationalist Yue revolt against the Han Chinese. In contrast, de Crespigny considers it unlikely that nationalist motives played a role.

The local armed forces of Kuaiji Administrator Yin Duan failed to defeat the insurgents, allowing them to overrun large parts of the commandery. A member of the local gentry, Sun Jian, was among those ordered to press-gang troops for the government cause. Appointed acting major, he managed to raise a militia of about 1,000 men. He and his force served with distinction while fighting the rebels.

Despite the efforts of Kuaiji Commandery's loyalists, the insurgents were already so successful that they even invaded other commanderies. As result, the government appointed the official Zhang Min as Inspector of Yang Province to deal with the issue. Troops from the entire province were mobilized, with Chen Yi, Administrator of Danyang, becoming Zhang's most important co-commander. In 173, the provincial authorities reported Administrator Yin Duan for his failure to defeat the rebels, but his registrar Zhu Jun successfully bribed officials in the capital of Luoyang so that Yin was only received a convict sentence instead of being executed.

The troops of Zhang Min and Chen Yi finally suppressed the uprising in late 174, killing Xu Chang, Xu Sheng, and Ju Kang.

Aftermath 

Zhang Min was rewarded for his success by being appointed Administrator of Danyang. He also recommended Sun Jian for his good service, whereupon the latter got a post as assistant magistrate in Guangling Commandery, and later in two counties in Xiapi. Sun Jian consequently expanded his following which helped him to rise to great promince.

Zhu Jun's involvement in the bribery to save Yin Duan's life initially remained unknown. He went on to have a distinguished career, faithfully serving the central government until the collapse of the Han dynasty into civil war.

Notes

References

Works cited 

170s conflicts
Rebellions during the end of the Han dynasty